Dianne Leigh (born , sometimes spelled as Diane Leigh) is a Canadian country music performer. She was the first recipient of the Gold Leaf Award (later the Juno Awards) in 1970.

In 1994, music trade publication RPM considered her the ninth top Canadian country artist of the past 30 years based on her standings in the publication's charts.

Leigh recorded in the late 1960s for the American label Chart Records but failed to make the US charts with any single releases.  Her Canadian hits "The Wife You Save May Be Your Own" (written by Liz Anderson) and "I'm Gonna Let George Do It" are featured in the 1969 Chart compilation album Best of Our Country Girls with additional tracks by Lynn Anderson, Maxine Brown, Connie Eaton, and LaWanda Lindsey.

In the 1970s, she was a co-host on the CHCH-TV series The Harry Hibbs Show  and also recorded for Ray Griff's Global Television series.

Awards and recognition
 1965: RPM Awards, top country female singer
 1970: Gold Leaf Award, Best Country Female Artist
 1971: nominated, Juno Award, Best Country Female Artist
 1974: nominated, Juno Award, Best Country Female Artist
 2015: Canadian Country Music Hall of Fame inductee

Singles

References

1940s births
Canadian women country singers
Canadian women singers
Juno Award winners
Living people
Musicians from Toronto